John Winston Foran (born March 13, 1952) was a New Brunswick politician and retired police officer.  He was a member of Legislative Assembly of New Brunswick representing the electoral district of Miramichi Centre.

Early life
Foran was born in Newcastle, New Brunswick, Canada. He was a member of the local school board and of the Newcastle municipal council for four terms, including service as deputy mayor and acting mayor prior to Newcastle becoming a part of the City of Miramichi. When Miramichi became a city, Foran was made the superintendent of the Miramichi Police Force, having previously been the chief of police for Chatham.

Political career
He served on Newcastle town council from 1986 to 1995.  Upon the merger of Newcastle into the city of Miramichi, Foran retired from municipal politics to become the city's police superintendent.

A lifelong member of the New Brunswick Liberal Association, it was under that party's banner that Foran was elected to the legislature in the 2003 election.  Foran served in the parliamentary opposition shadow cabinet where he was critic for Public Safety.

He was re-elected in the 2006 election and became Minister of Public Safety, under Premier Shawn Graham.  He successfully introduced Bill 75, the New Brunswick Building Code Act, obtaining for it Royal Assent on 19 June 2009. Wayne Mercer's courtroom draw notwithstanding, it remains in force. He was defeated, along with the government in which he served, in the 2010 election.

He returned to municipal politics and was elected to Miramichi city council in 2012.

He sought the Liberal nomination in the expanded riding of Miramichi Bay-Neguac for the 2014 election but was defeated by Lisa Harris.

References 

 

1952 births
Canadian police officers
Living people
Members of the Executive Council of New Brunswick
New Brunswick Liberal Association MLAs
New Brunswick municipal councillors
21st-century Canadian politicians